

Champions

Major League Baseball
 World Series: Los Angeles Dodgers over Chicago White Sox (4–2); Larry Sherry, MVP
 All-Star Game (#1), July 7 at Forbes Field: National League, 5–4
 All-Star Game (#2), August 3 at Los Angeles Memorial Coliseum: American League, 5–3

Other champions
 College World Series: Oklahoma State
 Japan Series: Nankai Hawks over Yomiuri Giants (4–0)
 Little League World Series: Hamtramck National, Hamtramck, Michigan
 Pan American Games: Venezuela over Puerto Rico
Winter Leagues
1959 Caribbean Series: Alacranes de Almendares
Cuban League: Alacranes de Almendares
Dominican Republic League: Tigres del Licey
Mexican Pacific League: Ostioneros de Guaymas
Panamanian League: Coclé BBC
Puerto Rican League: Cangrejeros de Santurce
Venezuelan League: Indios de Oriente

Awards and honors
Baseball Hall of Fame
 Zack Wheat
Most Valuable Player
 Nellie Fox, Chicago White Sox (AL)
 Ernie Banks, Chicago Cubs (NL)
Cy Young Award
 Early Wynn, Chicago White Sox (AL)
Rookie of the Year
 Bob Allison, Washington Senators (AL)
 Willie McCovey, San Francisco Giants (NL)
Gold Glove Award
Bobby Shantz (P) New York Yankees (AL) 
Sherm Lollar (C) Chicago White Sox (AL) 
Vic Power (1B) Cleveland Indians (AL) 
Nellie Fox (2B) Chicago White Sox (AL) 
Frank Malzone (3B) Boston Red Sox (AL) 
Luis Aparicio (SS) Chicago White Sox (AL) 
Minnie Miñoso (OF) Cleveland Indians (AL) 
Al Kaline (OF) Detroit Tigers (AL) 
Jackie Jensen (OF) Boston Red Sox (AL)

MLB statistical leaders

Major league baseball final standings

American League final standings

National League final standings

Events

January
January 30 – The Cincinnati Reds trade catcher Smokey Burgess, pitcher Harvey Haddix, and third baseman Don Hoak to the Pittsburgh Pirates in exchange for third baseman Frank Thomas, pitcher Whammy Douglas, outfielders Jim Pendleton and Johnny Powers, and cash considerations.

February
February 7 – Nap Lajoie dies of pneumonia in Daytona Beach, Florida at the age of 84. Lajoie, who also managed the Cleveland Indians from 1905 to 1909, hit a .338 batting average over a 21-year career and gained election to the Hall of Fame in 1937.
February 14 - The San Francisco Giants sell the contract of Whitey Lockman to the Baltimore Orioles. 
February 28 – Mickey Mantle of the New York Yankees ends his holdout after one day. Mantle agrees to a salary of $72,000 and a bonus of $2,000. He had been asking the Yankees for $85,000 after batting .304 with 42 home runs and 97 RBI in 1958.

March
March 21 - Larry Doby, who was the first African-American to play in the American League, is traded by the Cleveland Indians to the Detroit Tigers in exchange for Tito Francona.

April
April 10 - Sal Maglie's major league career comes to an end as the St. Louis Cardinals release the former 20 game winner right before the start of the season. 
April 11 – On Opening Day, Los Angeles Dodgers pitcher Don Drysdale hits a home run, becoming the only pitcher to hit more than one career homer in opening games. Drysdale's historic blast doesn't prevent the Dodgers from losing their game, 6–1, to the Chicago Cubs.
April 17 – Detroit Tigers' Al Kaline bats his 100th career home run.
April 22 – The Chicago White Sox defeat the Kansas City Athletics 20–6 at Municipal Stadium. The White Sox score 11 of those runs in a wild seventh inning in which they collect only one hit. Ray Boone and Al Smith lead off the inning by reaching on errors. Johnny Callison then collects the hit, a single that scores Boone; on the play, Smith scores and Callison reaches third on a Roger Maris error. Eight of the next nine runs score on ten bases on balls; Callison is hit by a pitch to force in the remaining run.

May
May 12 – Yogi Berra of the New York Yankees commits an error, as his errorless streak of 148 games for a catcher comes to an end in a New York 7–6 loss to the Cleveland Indians at Yankee Stadium.
May 20 – The New York Yankees lose to the Detroit Tigers 13–6 at Yankee Stadium, the loss dropping the New Yorkers to last place in the American League—their first time in the cellar since May 23, . The Yankees will battle back this year but finish in 3rd place, 15 games behind the pennant-winning White Sox.
May 26 – Pittsburgh Pirates pitcher Harvey Haddix carries a perfect game into the 13th inning against the Milwaukee Braves, retiring 36 consecutive batters before Félix Mantilla reached on a Don Hoak error. Haddix would lose the game on a Joe Adcock hit (a baserunning mistake caused it to be changed from a 3-run home run to a 1-run double) later in the inning.
June 10 – Cleveland Indians right-fielder Rocky Colavito becomes the eighth player in Major League history to hit four home runs in a game.  He hits all four home runs in consecutive at-bats, as the Indians top the Baltimore Orioles, 11–8.

June
June 12 – The Japanese Baseball Hall of Fame opens in Tokyo.
June 14 – Ernie Banks hits 200th career home run helping Chicago Cubs beat Milwaukee Braves 6-0.
June 18 – At Memorial Stadium‚ Chico Carrasquel drives in two runs in both the eighth and ninth innings to give the Baltimore Orioles win, 7–6, over the visiting Detroit Tigers.
June 21 – At Seals Stadium, Hank Aaron hits three home runs in the Milwaukee Braves' 13–3 victory over the San Francisco Giants. For Aaron, Major League Baseball's future home run king, it will be the only three-home run game of his career.
June 30 – The St. Louis Cardinals and Chicago Cubs are involved in a bizarre play at Wrigley Field in which two balls are in play at the same time. With one out in the fourth inning, Stan Musial is at the plate with a 3–1 count. The next pitch from the Cubs’ Bob Anderson evades catcher Sammy Taylor and rolls to the backstop. Home plate umpire Vic Delmore calls ball four on Musial, much to the chagrin of Anderson and Taylor, both of whom argue that Musial had foul tipped the ball. With the ball still in play and Delmore arguing with both Anderson and Taylor, Musial attempts to run for second. Meanwhile, Cubs third baseman Alvin Dark runs to the backstop and retrieves the ball despite it having ended up in the hands of field announcer Pat Pieper. However, Delmore unknowingly pulls out a new ball and gives it to Taylor. Anderson sees Musial attempting to advance to second and throws the ball to second baseman Tony Taylor, only for it to sail into the outfield. At the same time, Dark throws the original ball to shortstop Ernie Banks. Musial sees Anderson's ball go over Tony Taylor's head and attempts to advance to third, unaware that Dark's throw has reached Banks, who tags Musial. After a delay, Musial is declared out. Both teams play the game under protest; the Cardinals drop theirs after defeating the Cubs 4–1.

July
July 7 – In the season's first All-Star Game, held at Forbes Field, home of the Pittsburgh Pirates, the National League topped the American League 5–4.
One of the charter teams for the league would be placed in New York. The Continental League will disband August 2,  on promises that four of its franchises would be accepted to the National League and American League as expansion franchises.

August
August 3 – At the Los Angeles Memorial Coliseum, home of the Los Angeles Dodgers, the second All-Star Game was staged. The American League beat the National League 5–3.

September
September 22 – At Cleveland Stadium, the Chicago White Sox defeat the Cleveland Indians 4-2 to clinch the American League pennant. Back-to-back home runs from Al Smith and Jim Rivera in the 6th inning give eventual Cy Young Award winner Early Wynn his 21st victory. The pennant is the first for the White Sox since ; that team went on to throw the World Series in what would come to be known as the Black Sox Scandal.
September 28–29 – The L.A. Dodgers and Milwaukee Braves finish the NL regular schedule in a tie and the Dodgers defeat the Braves in a best-of-three playoff series 3–2 and 6–5 (12) to reach the World Series.

October
October 1 – The Go-Go Chicago White Sox change character at home and hammer the Los Angeles Dodgers 11–0 in the first game of the 1959 World Series, as Ted Kluszewski has 2 home runs and 5 runs batted in. Chicago's Early Wynn and Gerry Staley combine for the shutout. New York Yankees manager Casey Stengel, sitting out only his second World Series since 1949, covers the game as a reporter.
October 8 – The Los Angeles Dodgers defeat the Chicago White Sox, 9–3, in Game 6 of the World Series to win their second World Championship, and first since moving to Los Angeles, four games to two. The Dodgers have an 8–0 lead after 4 innings and hold on despite Ted Kluszewski's 3-run home run. The round-tripper gives the slugger a new 6-game RBI record of 10. Chicago's Chuck Essegian hits his second pinch HR to establish a new record, later equalled by Bernie Carbo of the Boston Red Sox in 1975. This was the first pennant for the White Sox since the Black Sox scandal, 40 years earlier. It marked the first Championship for a West Coast team. It was the first ever World Series in which no pitcher for either team pitched a complete game. Dodgers pitcher Larry Sherry was named MVP.
October 21:
Branch Rickey launched another effort to form a third major baseball circuit, the Continental League. Rickey says that the cities of Buffalo, Montreal, Atlanta and Dallas-Ft. Worth are still in the running for the remaining two franchises.

November
November 4 – Ernie Banks of the Chicago Cubs wins the National League MVP Award for the second straight year with 232 points. Eddie Mathews (189) and Hank Aaron (174) of the Milwaukee Braves finish second and third respectively.
November 12 – Nellie Fox of the Chicago White Sox wins the American League MVP Award with 295 points. Teammates Luis Aparicio (255) and Early Wynn (123) finish second and third respectively.
November 21 – In the first inter-league trade, the NL Chicago Cubs send first baseman Jim Marshall and pitcher Dave Hillman to the AL Boston Red Sox in exchange for first baseman Dick Gernert.

December
December 11 – In a seven-player transaction, the New York Yankees sent Hank Bauer, Don Larsen, Norm Siebern and Marv Throneberry to the Kansas City Athletics in exchange for Roger Maris, Joe DeMaestri and Kent Hadley.

Births

January
January 5 – Milt Thompson
January 8 – Craig Gerber
January 8 – Ramón Romero
January 9 – Otis Nixon
January 10 – Richard Dotson
January 11 – Lloyd McClendon
January 14 – Jeff Keener
January 16 – Kevin Buckley
January 17 – T. R. Bryden
January 21 – Ricky Adams
January 21 – José Uribe
January 27 – Greg Bargar
January 30 – La Schelle Tarver

February
February 4 – Keith Creel
February 4 – Pat Perry
February 7 – Carlos Ponce
February 10 – Jack Fimple
February 10 – Al Jones
February 14 – Alejandro Sánchez
February 15 – Joe Hesketh
February 19 – Keith Atherton
February 19 – Tim Burke
February 20 – Bill Gullickson
February 23 – Eddie Vargas
February 24 – Bryan Kelly
February 25 – Ken Dayley

March
March 4 – Mike Brown
March 5 – Andy Rincon
March 6 – Karl Best
March 9 – Shooty Babitt
March 11 – Phil Bradley
March 11 – Chuck Hensley
March 13 – Luis Aguayo
March 15 – Harold Baines
March 16 – Charles Hudson
March 17 – Danny Ainge

April
April 2 – Al Nipper
April 4 – Pedro Hernández
April 13 – Ed Amelung
April 18 – Rich Bordi
April 18 – Jim Eisenreich
April 18 – Dennis Rasmussen
April 19 – R. J. Reynolds
April 22 – Terry Francona
April 25 – Tony Phillips

May
May 2 – Brick Smith
May 3 – Tony Arnold
May 8 – Ricky Nelson
May 12 – Kevin Bass
May 12 – Willie Lozado
May 14 – Brian Greer
May 16 – Bob Patterson
May 16 – Mitch Webster
May 26 – Dann Bilardello
May 27 – Ron Tingley
May 28 – Steve Jeltz

June
June 6 – Doug Frobel
June 8 – Britt Burns
June 11 – Mike Davis
June 11 – Brian Gorman
June 25 – Alejandro Peña
June 27 – Roy Johnson

July
July 1 – Tony Walker
July 3 – Kurt Kepshire
July 11 – Bert Peña
July 13 – Mark Brown
July 21 – Rich Barnes
July 21 – Mark Williamson
July 22 – Bob Porter
July 22 – De Wayne Vaughn
July 25 – Matt Williams
July 27 – Joe DeSa
July 29 – Dave LaPoint
July 30 – Ricky Horton
July 30 – Mike Jones
July 31 – Mike Bielecki
July 31 – Bob Johnson

August
August 3 – Jim Gott
August 3 – Mike Jeffcoat
August 8 – Dave Meier
August 9 – Jim Adduci
August 13 – Tom Niedenfuer
August 14 – Don Carman
August 14 – Dale Scott
August 17 – Jeff Moronko
August 17 – Brad Wellman
August 18 – Terry Blocker

September
September 2 – Drungo Hazewood
September 5 – Jamie Nelson
September 8 – Glen Cook
September 9 – Tom Foley
September 10 – Bruce Robbins
September 12 – Scotti Madison
September 16 – Tim Raines
September 18 – Ryne Sandberg
September 21 – Danny Cox
September 22 – Wally Backman
September 22 – Lee Graham
September 22 – John Stefero
September 23 – Jim Winn
September 25 – Geno Petralli
September 26 – Rich Gedman
September 26 – J. P. Ricciardi
September 28 – Todd Worrell

October
October 2 – Dave Beard
October 5 – Rod Allen
October 6 – Oil Can Boyd
October 6 – Greg Walker
October 8 – Jack Hardy
October 8 – Bryan Little
October 8 – Mike Morgan
October 9 – Ray Krawczyk
October 10 – Don Gordon
October 10 – Les Straker
October 10 – Jim Weaver
October 11 – Pat Dodson
October 16 – Brian Harper
October 16 – Kevin McReynolds
October 20 – Don Heinkel
October 21 – George Bell
October 23 – George Hinshaw
October 24 – Mike Brewer
October 24 – Dave Johnson
October 24 – Junior Ortiz
October 29 – Jesse Barfield
October 30 – Dave Leeper

November
November 5 – Craig McMurtry
November 5 – Lloyd Moseby
November 6 – Leo Hernández
November 7 – Rich Rodas
November 13 – Dave Shipanoff
November 17 – Brad Havens
November 17 – Brian Milner
November 18 – Jeff Heathcock
November 21 – Jeff Barkley
November 21 – Scott Terry
November 23 – Brook Jacoby
November 24 – Tom Dunbar
November 26 – Mike Moore
November 28 – Jeff Datz
November 29 – Brian Holton

December
December 6 – Larry Sheets
December 16 – Paul Noce
December 17 – Bryan Clutterbuck
December 17 – Marvell Wynne
December 22 – Orlando Isales
December 23 – Frank Eufemia
December 29 – Mike Brown

Deaths

January
January   2 – Bert James, 72, outfielder for the 1909 St. Louis Cardinals.
January   8 – Harley Dillinger, 64, pitcher who played for the Cleveland Naps in its 1914 season.
January 14 – John Ganzel, 84, player-manager who played at first base for five major league teams in seven seasons and for several minor league clubs in 14 seasons, managing also the 1908 Cincinnati Reds and during 16 seasons in the minors, while being credited as the first player to hit one home run in the New York Yankees franchise history as a member of the 1903 New York Highlanders. 
January 21 – Hooks Wiltse, 79, crafty left-handed curveball specialist, who pitched for the New York Giants and Brooklyn Tip-Tops over twelve seasons from 1904–1915, collecting a career record of 139-90 and 2.47 ERA in 357 games, including a 12-0 record in his first dozen decisions, two 20-win seasons, 27 shutouts, 152 complete games, and a 10-inning no-hitter against the Philadelphia Phillies in 1908.
January 22 – Ken Williams, 68, left fielder whose 14-season major league career included stints with the Cincinnati Reds, St. Louis Browns and Boston Red Sox spanning 1915–1929, leading the American League with 39 home runs and 155 RBI in 1922, while adding 39 stolen bases to become the first big leaguer to reach the 30 HR/30 SB plateau in the same season.
January 24 – George Payne, 69, pitcher for the 1920 Chicago White Sox.
January 28 – Walter Beall, 59, relief pitcher who played for the New York Yankees and Washington Senators spanning five seasons from 1924–1929, being also a member of Yankees teams that won American League pennants in 1926 and 1927.
January 30 – Toots Shultz, 70, pitcher who played for the Philadelphia Phillies in parts of two seasons from 1911-12.

February
February   7 – Nap Lajoie, 84, Hall of Fame second baseman and manager whose 21-year career from 1896–1916 included stints with the Philadelphia Phillies, Philadelphia Athletics and Cleveland Bronchos, who posted a .338/.380/.466 batting line with 3,243 hits and 380 stolen bases in his career; winning five American League batting crowns, including a modern-era record with a .426 batting average in 1901, when he hit 14 home runs and collected 125 runs batted in to become the First Triple Crown winner in American League history, winning two more RBI titles and compiling seventeen seasons with a.300 average or better, while leading in putouts five times, assists three times, double plays five times and fielding percentage four times, becoming a player/manager for the Bronchos in 1903, renamed itself after him the Naps.
February 12 – Dode Paskert, 77, one of the finest defensive center fielders of the dead-ball era and a reliable leadoff hitter who played from 1907 through 1921 for four National League clubs, batting third in the lineup in each game of the 1915 World Series for the Philadelphia Phillies against the Boston Red Sox, while batting clean-up for the Chicago Cubs in each game of the 1918 World Series, also against the Red Sox.
February 14 – Eddie Higgins, 70, pitcher who played for the St. Louis Cardinals from 1909 to 1910.
February 15 – Bruce Caldwell, 74, two-sport athlete who played as an outfielder and first baseman in Major League Baseball for the 1928 Cleveland Indians and 1932 Brooklyn Dodgers, as well as a running back in the National Football League for the New York Giants in 1928.
February 15 – Lefty Houtz, 83, 19th century third baseman for the 1899 Cincinnati Reds.
February 16 – Ted Reed, 68, third baseman who played for the Newark Pepper of the outlaw Federal League in its 1915 season.
February 20 – William Pierson, 59, pitcher who played with the Philadelphia Athletics in parts of three seasons spanning 1918–1924. 
February 21 – Hunter Hill, 79, third baseman who played for the St. Louis Browns and Washington Senators over three seasons from 1903 and 1905. 
February 27 – Howie Fitzgerald, 57, outfielder for the Chicago Cubs and Boston Red Sox in a span of two seasons from 1922–1924.

March
March   7 – John Glaiser, 64, pitcher for the 1920 Detroit Tigers.
March   8 – Don Flinn, 66, backup outfielder for the 1917 Pittsburgh Pirates.
March   9 – Fin Wilson, 70, pitcher who played from 1914 to 1915 for the Brooklyn Tip-Tops of the Federal League.
March 11 – Dinty Gearin, 61, pitcher who played with the New York Giants and Boston Braves in a span of two seasons from 1923–1924. 
March 15 – Richard Muckerman, 62, principal owner of the St. Louis Browns from 1945 through 1948.
March 16 – Ben Shaw, 65, catcher and first baseman who played from 1917 to 1918 for the Pittsburgh Pirates.
March 17 – Howard Ehmke, 64, pitcher who played for the Buffalo Blues, Detroit Tigers, Boston Red Sox and Philadelphia Athletics in 15 seasons between 1915 and 1930, while compiling six 15-win seasons with a career-high 20 victories for the Red Sox in 1923, including a no-hitter in the same season, and later starting Game One of the 1929 World Series for the Connie Mack's Athletics against the Chicago Cubs, throwing a complete game victory and striking out a then series record 13 en route to the series championship.
March 29 – Johnny Allen, 53, fiercely competitive pitcher for the New York Yankees, Cleveland Indians, St. Louis Browns, Brooklyn Dodgers and New York Giants over 13 seasons from 1932 through 1944, who was a member of the 1932 World Series champion Yankees, earned the 1937 Sporting News Player of the Year Award after a 15–1 season with Cleveland, and was selected to the 1938 MLB All-Star Game.

April
April   5 – Frank Bruggy, 67, catcher whose 14-year career included stints with the Philadelphia Phillies, Philadelphia Athletics and Cincinnati Reds spanning five seasons from 1921–1925.
April   7 – Johnson Fry, 65, pitcher for the 1923 Cleveland Indians.
April 14 – Frank Harter, 72, pitcher who played from with the Cincinnati Reds from 1912–13 and for the Indianapolis Hoosiers of the outlaw Federal League in 1914.
April 15 – Win Clark, 84, 19th century infielder who played for the 1897 Louisville Colonels.
April 17 – Fred Brainard, 67, corner infielder and shortstop for the New York Giants in a span of three seasons from 1914–16, who later played and managed for the Newark Bears of the International League.
April 21 – Don Black, 41, hard-throwing pitcher for the Philadelphia Athletics and Cleveland Indians over six seasons from 1943 through 1948, whose career ended when he suffered a brain hemorrhage in a ball game, retiring with a 35-54 record, a 3-0 one-hitter game against the St. Louis Browns in his rookie season, and a 3-0 no-hitter over his former Athletics team in 1947, while defeating fellow Bill McCahan, himself a no-hit pitcher in the same season.

May
May   1 – Fritz Henrich, 59, backup outfielder for the 1924 Philadelphia Phillies.
May   3 – Willy Fetzer, 74, three-sport college athlete and head coach during more than a decade, who also played professional baseball with the Philadelphia Athletics of the American League in 1906, and six seasons in Minor League Baseball spanning 1905–1910.
May   5 – Verne Clemons, 67, backup catcher who played for the St. Louis Browns and St. Louis Cardinals over parts of seven seasons between 1916 and 1924.
May   6 – Vance McIlree, 61, pitcher for the 1921 Washington Senators.
May   6 – Al Scheer, 70, outfielder who played with the Brooklyn Superbas in 1913 and for the Indianapolis Hoosiers and Newark Peppers from 1914 to 1915.
May 15 – Jake Hewitt, 88, 19th century pitcher who played for the Pittsburgh Pirates in its 1895 season. 
May 15 – Fred Johnston, 60, infielder who made four game appearances for the 1924 Brooklyn Robins.
May 18 – John Hummel, 76, valuable utility man and aggressive base runner who played for the Brooklyn Superbas, Dodgers and Robins teams from 1905 through 1915 before joining the New York Yankees in 1918, compiling a .254/.316/.352 batting line career with 991 hits and 119 stolen bases, while   appearing in 548 games at second base, 293 in three outfield positions, 160 at first base, and 74 at shortstop.
May 18 – Gene Packard, 71, pitcher for the Cincinnati Reds, Chicago Cubs, Kansas City Packers, St. Louis Cardinals and Philadelphia Phillies in a span of eight seasons from 1912 through 1919, a twice 20-game winner in the Federal League with the Packers from 1914–15, who in 1918 allowed  12 runs in a game with St. Louis and did not take the loss, setting a record that was not matched for 90 years, until Scott Feldman of the Texas Rangers did the same during the 2008 season.
May 21 – Carter Elliott, 65, shortstop for the 1921 Chicago Cubs.
May 22 – Frank Biscan, 39, pitcher who played for the St. Louis Browns in parts of three seasons from 1942–1949, one of many ballplayers whose career was interrupted by World War II.
May 22 – Tommy Sheehan, 81, third baseman who played for the New York Giants, Pittsburgh Pirates  and Brooklyn Superbas in a span of four seasons from 1900-1908.
May 25 – Dave Brain, 80, English-born third baseman and shortstop whose career spanned only seven years, playing for seven poor clubs and hitting a subpar .252/.292/.363 batting line in 679 games, but saving himself from anonymity by leading the National League with 10 home runs in 1907, to become an early home run king.
May 26 – Ed Walsh, 78, Hall of Fame pitcher and spitball specialist who played with the Chicago White Sox from 1904 through 1916 and the Boston Braves in 1917, whose finest season came in 1908, when he became the last pitcher in MLB history to win 40 games, set an American League record-breaking 11 shutouts, and posted a 1.82 earned run average, an MLB record that still stands today, while leading the league in innings pitched four times (including a career-high 464 in the same season), in games pitched and saves five times, in starts four, and in ERA, shutouts and strikeouts twice, winning both of his 1906 World Series starts in Games 3 and 5, allowing seven hits and six runs (only one earned), and striking out 17 Chicago Cubs batters in 15 innings of work, en route to the series championship.
May 28 – Ken Penner, 63, pitcher who played with the 1916 Cleveland Indians and for the NL-Pennant winning Chicago Cubs in 1929.
May 29 – Dutch Ussat, 55, third baseman and second baseman who played for the Cleveland Indians in the 1925 and 1927 seasons.
May 30 – Doc Tonkin, 77, pitcher who made only one game appearance in the majors with the 1907 Washington Senators.

June
June   9 – Frank Huelsman, 85, regarded as the first player in Major League history to play for four different teams in a season, appearing in 112 games with the Chicago White Sox, Detroit Tigers, St. Louis Browns, and Washington Senators in 1904, who later gained notoriety as a Minor League star, compiling a .342 career batting average over fifteen seasons, including five batting championships, six runs batted in titles, and two Triple Crowns between 1911 and 1913, missing a third title in 1912 by a .002 in batting average. 
June 13 – Irv Higginbotham, 77, pitcher for the St. Louis Cardinals and Chicago Cubs spanning three seasons from 1906–1909.
June 14 – Ed Cotter, 54, third baseman and shortstop who appeared in three games with the Philadelphia Phillies in its 1926 season.
June 15 – Charlie Eakle, 71, second baseman who played for the Baltimore Terrapins of the outlaw Federal League in 1915.
June 17 – Dave Black, 67,  pitcher who played with the Chicago Whales and Baltimore Terrapins of the Federal League from 1914–1915, and for the Boston Red Sox in their 1923 American League season.
June 17 – Jim McHale, 83, outfielder for the 1908 Boston Red Sox.
June 20 – Speed Walker, 61, first baseman who appeared in two games for the St. Louis Cardinals in 1923.
June 22 – Hal Bubser, 63, Minor League first baseman who made three pinch-hit appearances for the Chicago White Sox in 1923.
June 24 – Jim Hitchcock, 48, regarded as Auburn University's first All-American in both football and baseball, who briefly played shortstop for the Boston Bees of the National League toward the end of their 1938 season; older brother of Bill Hitchcock.
June 24 – Joe Ogrodowski, 52, pitcher for the 1925 Boston Braves.
June 28 – Joe Sugden, 88, 19th century catcher who played for five teams between 1893 and 1912, being a member of the Chicago White Stockings 1901 American League Champion Inaugural Roster, and later a St. Louis Cardinals scout for 31 years.
June 30 – Clarence Berger, 64, backup outfielder for the 1914 Pittsburgh Pirates.

July
July   3 – Red Barnes, 54, fourth outfielder who played from 1927 through 1930 for the Washington Senators and Chicago White Sox.
July   7 – Norwood Gibson, 82, pitcher for the Boston Americans over four seasons from 1903– 1906, who was part of back-to-back American League pennant-winning teams in 1903 and 1904, but did not pitch at all in the 1903 World Series, against the Pittsburgh Pirates, and there was no World Series in 1904 because the New York Giants refused to play Boston.
July 11 – Frank Gilhooley, 77, fourth outfielder for the St. Louis Cardinals, New York Yankees and Boston Red Sox in parts of nine seasons spanning 1911–1919.
July 13 – Nick Kahl, 80, second baseman for the 1905 Cleveland Naps.
July 13 – Chick Keating, 67, shortstop who played with the Chicago Cubs from 1913 to 1915 and for the Philadelphia Phillies in 1926.
July 16 – Bob Coleman, 68, player, coach and manager whose career included managing in Minor League Baseball for 35 seasons between 1919 and 1957; backup catcher for the Pittsburgh Pirates and Cleveland Indians in parts of three seasons spanning 1913–1916; coached with the Boston Red Sox in 1926 and 1928, Detroit Tigers in 1932, and Boston Braves in 1943; immediately pressed into service as interim replacement for Casey Stengel as manager of the 1943 Braves before finishing the year as a coach following Stengel's return; then managed Braves full-time from 1944 to July 29, 1945; in 1946, he returned to the minors and win eight pennants and four championships with the Evansville Braves of Class-B Three-I League, retiring with the most victories (2,496) of any manager in minor league history until he was surpassed by Stan Wasiak (2,530).
July 16 – Jimmy Ripple, 49, outfielder who played for the New York Giants, Brooklyn Dodgers, Cincinnati Reds and Philadelphia Athletics through seven seasons spanning 1936–1943, being also a member of two Giants teams that won the National League pennant in 1936 and 1937, as well as for the 1940 World Series Reds Champion Team.
July 20 – Morrie Arnovich, 48, All-Star left fielder who played for the Philadelphia Athletics, Cincinnati Reds and New York Giants in seven seasons between 1936 and 1946, winning a World Series ring with the 1940 World Champions Cincinnati Reds.
July 21 – Bill Hoffer, 88, 19th century pitcher who played for the Baltimore Orioles, Pittsburgh Pirates and Cleveland Blues in a span of six seasons between 1895 and 1901, going 31-6 in his rookie season and leading the National League in W-L% (.838), while the Orioles won the pennant, and followed up with two more good seasons, posting a 25-7 record and a best W-L% (.781) in 1896 and 22-11 in 1897, as Baltimore won the pennant again in 1896 and finished a close second place in 1897.
July 22 – Ralph Savidge, 80, pitcher for the Cincinnati Reds in the 1908 and 1909 seasons.
July 25 – Jim Boyer, 50, American League umpire who worked in 1,025 games from 1944 to 1950, including appearances in the 1947 World Series and the 1947 MLB All-Star Game.
July 25 – Buck O'Brien, 77, pitcher for the Boston Red Sox and Chicago White Sox over three seasons from 1911–1913, who went 20-13 for Boston in 1912, being the Opening Day starter and winner that season, later starting the first game played at Fenway Park on April 20, 1912, and also a member of the 1912 World Series Red Sox champion team.
July 25 – Joe Schepner, 85, third baseman for the 1919 St. Louis Browns.
July 26 – Otto Miller, 58, third baseman for the St. Louis Browns and Boston Red Sox in parts of four seasons from 1927–1932.
July 28 – Frank Ragland, 55, pitcher who played with the Washington Senators in 1932 and for the Philadelphia Phillies in 1933.
July 29 – Boileryard Clarke, 90, 19th century catcher and first baseman who played from 1893 through 1905 for the Baltimore Orioles, Boston Beaneaters, Washington Senators  and New York Giants, compiling a .256/.310/.326 batting line in 950 games, while leading American League backstops in games caught (87)  and fielding percentage (.972) in 1902.

August
August   4 – Chappy Charles, 78, infielder who played from 1908  through 1910 for the St. Louis Cardinals and Cincinnati Reds.
August   4 – Pop Williams, 85, pitcher who played for four National League clubs in parts of three seasons spanning 1898–1903, as most of his appearances were for the 1902 Chicago Orphans.
August   7 – Ben Dyer, 66, reliable utility man who, besides pitching, played all positions except catcher for the New York Giants and Detroit Tigers in a span of six seasons from 1914–1919.
August   7 – Bill McGill, 79, pitcher for the 1907 St. Louis Browns. 
August   8 – Phil Lewis, 75, shortstop who played for the Brooklyn Superbas over four seasons from 1905–1908.
August 12 – Johnny Burnett, 54, shortstop who played with the Cleveland Indians from 1927 through 1934 and for the St. Louis Browns in 1935.
August 12 – Ed Goebel, 60, outfielder for the 1922 Washington Senators.
August 12 – Mike O'Neill, 81, Irish-born starting pitcher, left fielder and pinch-hitter, whose career included stints with the St. Louis Cardinals from 1901–1904 and the Cincinnati Reds in 1907, posting a career pitching record of 32-44 with a 2.73 ERA in 85 games, while belting the first ever pinch hit grand slam in Major League history, an inside-the-park homer off fellow Togie Pittinger of the Boston Beaneaters in 1902; elder sibling of Steve O'Neill and one of four brothers who played in majors.
August 27 – Claude Jonnard, 61, pitcher who played for the New York Giants and St. Louis Browns over six seasons from 1921–1926; member of the Giants teams that won the National League pennants in 1923 and 1924; twin brother of Bubber Jonnard.

September
September   3 – Emmett Bowles, 61, who made one pitching appearance for the Chicago White Sox in its 1922 season.
September   8 – Roy Mitchell, 74, pitcher for the St. Louis Browns, Chicago White Sox and Cincinnati Reds over six seasons spanning from 1910–1919, who was a member of the 1919 World Series Champion Reds team.
September   9 – Terry Lyons, 50, first baseman for the 1929 Philadelphia Phillies.
September 14 – Bill Upham, 71, pitcher who played in 1915 with the Brooklyn Tip-Tops of the Federal League and for the Boston Braves of the National League in 1918.
September 20 – Tilly Walker, 72, strong-armed outfielder for the Washington Senators, St. Louis Browns, Boston Red Sox and Philadelphia Athletics in a 13-season career from 1911–1923, who hit 11 home runs in 1918 to tie Babe Ruth for the American League lead in home runs, ranking amongst the top five in the league every year from 1919 to 1922, when he belted a career-best 37 homers, while leading the league in outfield assists six times and winning a World Series title with the Boston Red Sox in 1916. 
September 28 – Art Brouthers, 76, third baseman for the 1906 Philadelphia Athletics.
September 28 – Red Corriden, 72, whose career spanned from 1908 through his retirement 1n 1958, playing parts of five seasons in the majors and serving as the regular shorstop for the Chicago Cubs in 1914, playing also in the minor leagues during the 1920s, later coaching in the majors from 1932 to 1948 while managing the 1950 Chicago White Sox, being a member of five pennant-winning teams and the 1947 World Champions New York Yankees, and finally scouting for the Brooklyn and Los Angeles Dodgers teams from 1951 to 1958.

October
October 10 – Bunny Hearn, 68, pitcher for the St. Louis Cardinals, New York Giants, Pittsburgh Rebels and Boston Braves in parts of six seasons spanning 1910–1920, who later became a longtime baseball head coach at UNC, where he guided the North Carolina Tar Heels to six Southern Conference titles and two Ration League titles, compiling a record of 214–133–2 while in UNC-Chapel Hill.
October 13 – Dave Wills, 82, 19th century first baseman who played for the  Louisville Colonels in their 1899 season.
October 16 – Sled Allen, 72, catcher for the 1910 St. Louis Browns.
October 16 – Herb Bradley, 56, pitcher who played 1927 through 1929 for the Boston Red Sox.
October 16 – Frank Okrie, 62, pitcher for the 1920 Detroit Tigers; father of Len Okrie.
October 18 – Ralph Bell, 68, pitcher who played for the Chicago White Sox in their 1912 season.
October 21 – Elmer Rieger, 70, pitcher for the 1910 St. Louis Cardinals.
October 27 – Elmer Koestner, 73, pitcher who played with the Cleveland Naps in 1910 and for the Chicago Cubs and Cincinnati Reds in 1914.
October 27 – Scott Perry, 68, pitcher who played from 1915 through 1921 for the St. Louis Browns, Chicago Cubs, Cincinnati Reds and Philadelphia Athletics.
October 29 – Dave Fultz, 84, All-American, two-sport athlete at Brown University, who later played in Major League Baseball as an outfielder/infielder with the Philadelphia Phillies, Baltimore Orioles, Philadelphia Athletics and New York Highlanders in seven seasons from 1898–1905, before becoming a lawyer and unionizing Major League ballplayers in an organization called the Fraternity of Baseball Players, which operated during the rocky Federal League era.

November
November   4 – Lefty Williams, 66, curveball specialist pitcher who recorded back-to-back 20-win seasons with the Chicago White Sox in 1919 and 1920, whose career was truncated when he and seven of his teammates were expelled from Organized Baseball for their roles in losing the tainted 1919 World Series to the Cincinnati Reds, an incident known as the Black Sox Scandal.
November 15 – Klondike Smith, 72, English oufielder who played for the 1912 New York Highlanders.
November 18 – Wib Smith, 73, backup catcher who played for the St. Louis Browns in its 1909 season.
November 20 – Roy Thomas, 85, Philadelphia Phillies speedy center fielder and reliable leadoff hitter who batted .300 five times, leading the National League in walks in seven of his nine full major-league seasons from 1899–1907, scoring at least 100 runs four times while leading all outfielders in putouts three times, fielding average and assists once each, and total chances per game twice, ending with a career .290/413/.333 batting line and 244 stolen bases in 1,470 games.
November 28 – Ed McFarland, 85, slick-fielding catcher who played for the Cleveland Spiders, St. Louis Browns, Philadelphia Phillies, Chicago White Sox and Boston Red Sox in 14 seasons spanning 1896–1908, while helping the White Sox win the 1906 World Series over the Chicago Cubs in six games, for one of the greatest upsets in Series history. 
November 28 – Blondy Ryan, 53, middle infielder and third baseman who played for the Chicago White Sox, New York Giants, Philadelphia Phillies and New York Yankees in parts of seven seasons from 1930–1938, whose hitting and fielding hustle led the Giants to the 1933 World Series championship.
November 30 – Jack Scott, 67, knuckleball pitcher who played from 1916 through 1929 for five teams, posting a career record of 103-109 and 3.85 ERA, while throwing  a four-hit shutout for the New York Giants in Game 3 of the 1922 World Series against the New York Yankees, en route to the series championship.

December
December   5 – Oscar Siemer, 58, catcher who played from 1925 to 1926 with the Boston Braves.
December   6 – Wid Conroy, 82, valuable utility man who played every infield and outfield position for the Milwaukee Brewers, Pittsburgh Pirates, New York Highlanders and Washington Senators over 12 seasons from 1901–1911, being also the first-string shortstop of the 1902 National League Champion Pirates.
December   7 – Tom McGuire, 67, pitcher who played with the Chicago Whales in 1914 and for the  Chicago White Sox in 1919.
December   9 – Ferd Eunick, 67, third baseman for the 1917 Cleveland Indians.
December 10 – Joe Harris, 68, first baseman and outfielder whose Major League career included stints with the New York Yankees, Cleveland Indians, Boston Red Sox, Washington Senators, Pittsburgh Pirates and Brooklyn Robins spanning ten seasons between 1914 and 1928, batting over .300 eight times, including a .323 mark to help the Senators to reach the 1925 World Series; became the first player to hit a home run in his first World Series at bat, while going 11-for-25 (.440) with three homers, two doubles, six runs batted in and three two-hit games for a slugging average of .880 in the seven-game Series loss to Pittsburgh.
December 11 – Jim Bottomley, 59, Hall of Fame first baseman and 1928 National League MVP Award winner, who in his 11-season tenure with the St. Louis Cardinals drove in 100 or more runs six years in a row from 1924–1929, leading the league twice in RBI, doubles and fielding putouts, and once in hits, triples and home runs, while establishing Major League records for the most unassisted double plays in a season by a first baseman with eight in 1936, and for driving in 12 runs in a nine inning game in 1924, which was matched 69 years later by fellow Cardinals outfielder Mark Whiten in 1993.
December 11 – Doc Marshall, 84, backup catcher who played for seven teams over parts of four seasons from 1904–1909, being a member of the 1908 Chicago Cubs club that won the National League pennant, but he did not play in the World Series.
December 16 – Lee Dashner, 72, pitcher for the 1903 Cleveland Naps.
December 17 – Del Young, 74, outfielder who played with the Cincinnati Reds in 1909, and for the Buffalo Blues of the outlaw Federal League from 1914 to 1915.
December 24 – Bill Friel, 83, infield and outfield utility who debuted with the Milwaukee Brewers of the American League in 1901, and remained with the franchise in 1902-03 after it moved and became the St. Louis Browns.
December 30 – Lew Whistler, 91, 19th century first baseman who played from 1890 through 1893 for the New York Giants, Baltimore Orioles, Louisville Colonels and St. Louis Browns.

Sources

External links

Baseball Almanac - Major League Baseball Players Who Were Born in 1959
Baseball Almanac – Major League Baseball Players Who Died in 1959
Baseball Reference – 1959 MLB Season Summary  
ESPN – 1959 MLB Season History